Pablo Navas Alors (born 4 February 1992) is a Spanish footballer who plays for UE Sant Julià as a winger.

Football career
Born in La Carlota, Córdoba, Navas joined local Séneca CF's youth system in 2002, aged 10. Four years later he moved to La Liga giants FC Barcelona, after a short spell at Córdoba CF.

In July 2008 Navas joined Premier League side Portsmouth FC in a free transfer. He was released in April 2010, after failing to make a first-team appearance for Pompey.

In the 2010 summer Navas returned to his home country, signing with Atlético Madrid and being assigned to the Juvenil squad; a season later he moved to UD Marinaleda in Tercera División, making his senior debuts with the Andalusians during the season.

On 24 August 2012 Navas moved teams and countries again, joining Scottish Championship side Cowdenbeath FC. He played his first match as a professional on 17 November, coming on as a substitute in a 1–1 home draw against Airdrie United FC. He suffered an injury in March 2013, and left the club in May, after appearing in three games, all from the bench.

In January 2014, after nearly six months without action, Navas moved back to Spain, signing with CD Alcoyano in Segunda División B. He was released in May, after appearing in only four matches, and signed for fellow league team Lucena CF on 21 November.

On 3 September 2015 Navas joined CD Quintanar del Rey in the fourth level.

References

External links

EF Sports profile 

1992 births
Living people
Sportspeople from the Province of Córdoba (Spain)
Spanish footballers
Footballers from Andalusia
Association football wingers
Córdoba CF players
FC Barcelona players
Portsmouth F.C. players
Atlético Madrid footballers
Cowdenbeath F.C. players
CD Alcoyano footballers
Lucena CF players
CD Torrevieja players
FK Utenis Utena players
FC Ordino players
UE Sant Julià players
Segunda División B players
Tercera División players
Scottish Football League players
A Lyga players
Primera Divisió players
Spanish expatriate footballers
Spanish expatriate sportspeople in England
Spanish expatriate sportspeople in Scotland
Spanish expatriate sportspeople in Lithuania
Spanish expatriate sportspeople in Andorra
Expatriate footballers in Scotland
Expatriate footballers in England
Expatriate footballers in Lithuania
Expatriate footballers in Andorra